Warren Waugh (born 9 October 1980) is an English former professional footballer who played as a forward. He played professionally for English club Exeter City before dropping into non-league football.

Career
On 5 January 1999, Waugh made his debut for Exeter City as a substitute in a 3–1 win over Southend United in an EFL Trophy match. He then made his league debut four days later as an 86th minute substitute in a 4–0 win over Swansea City in a Football League Third Division match.

He then played in non-league football for the likes of Cambridge City, Crawley Town and in Wales for Caernarfon Town.

He was also part of the Fash FC squad during the 2003–04 season for the television program Fashanu's Football Challenge.

References

External links

Living people
1980 births
Association football forwards
English footballers
Exeter City F.C. players
English Football League players